This list of the Paleozoic life of Alaska contains the various prehistoric life-forms whose fossilized remains have been reported from within the US state of Alaska and are between 538.8 and 252.17 million years of age.

A

 †Abadehella
 †Acanthocladia
 †Acanthopecten
 †Acanthopecten carbonifer – or unidentified related form
 †Acanthopecten delawarensis – or unidentified related form
 †Acanthophyllum
  †Acanthopyge
 †Acervularia
 †Aclisina – tentative report
 †Acmarhachis
 †Acmarhachis acutus
 †Acrosaccus
 †Acrosaccus shuleri – or unidentified comparable form
 †Acrothele
 †Actinocystis – tentative report
 †Actinocystis perfecta – or unidentified comparable form
 †Actinostroma
 †Adolfispirifer
 †Adolfispirifer sanjuanensis
 †Afilasma
 †Agathammina
 †Agetolites
 †Aglaoglypta
  †Agoniatites – tentative report
 †Akidograptus
 †Akidograptus acuminatus
 †Alaskacirrus – type locality for genus
 †Alaskacirrus bandeli – type locality for species
 †Alaskaspongia
 †Alaskaspongia nana
 †Alaskaspongiella – type locality for genus
 †Alaskaspongiella laminosa – type locality for species
 †Alaskiella – type locality for genus
 †Alaskiella medfraensis – type locality for species
 †Alaskodiscus
 †Alaskodiscus donensis
 †Alaskospira
 †Alaskospira dunbari
 †Alaskozygopleura
 †Alaskozygopleura crassicostata
 †Albaillella
 †Albaillella cartalla – or unidentified related form
 †Aldanispirifer
 †Allonema
 †Allonema silurica
 †Allorhynchoides – type locality for genus
 †Allorhynchoides kirki – type locality for species
 †Alokistocare – or unidentified comparable form
 †Alokistocare lobatum
 †Alveolitella
 †Alveolites
 †Amblysiphonella
 †Ambocoelia
 †Ambocoelia planiconvexa – or unidentified related form
 †Ambocoelia umbonata
 †Amoenospirifer
 †Amoenospirifer angustiplicata
 †Amoenospirifer sulcalplicata
 †Amphipora
 †Amplexograptus
 †Amplexograptus confertus – or unidentified comparable form
 †Amplexograptus perexcavatus – or unidentified comparable form
 †Amplexoides
 †Amplexus
 †Anatrypa
 †Anatrypa alinensis – or unidentified related form
 †Anatrypa khavae – or unidentified comparable form
 †Ancillotoechia
 †Ancillotoechia antiquaria
 †Ancyrognathus
 †Ancyrognathus amana – or unidentified comparable form
 †Anematina
 †Anematina rockymontanum
 †Anemonaria
 †Anemonaria pseudohorrida
 †Angullongia
 †Angullongia minuta
 †Anidanthus
 †Anisopleurella
 †Anisopleurella tricostata – type locality for species
 †Anisotrypa – tentative report
 †Anomalograptus
 †Anomphalus – tentative report
 †Anopolenus
 †Anopolenus henrici
 †Anoptambonites
 †Anoptambonites grayae
 †Anoptambonites pulchra
 †Antherosalpinx
 †Anthraconeilo – tentative report
 †Aparchitella – tentative report
 †Aphelognathus
 †Aphelognathus divergens – or unidentified related form
 †Apheoorthis
 †Aphrosalpinx
 †Aphrosalpinx nana – type locality for species
 †Aphrosalpinx textilis
 †Aphyllum
 †Archaediscus
 †Archeocidaris – tentative report
 †Arctitreta
 †Arctitreta kempei – or unidentified comparable form
 †Arctozone – type locality for genus
 †Arctozone cooki – type locality for species
 †Arjamannia
 †Arjamannia thraivensis – or unidentified related form
 †Aseptirhynchia
 †Aseptirhynchia glabrata
 †Asgardaspira
 †Asgardaspira gerulus – type locality for species
 †Astralites
 †Astralites gamblei – type locality for species
 †Athabaskiella
 †Athabaskiella ardis – type locality for species
 †Athyris
 †Athyris lamellosa – or unidentified related form
 †Atomodesma – tentative report
  †Atrypa
 †Atrypa hystrix
 †Atrypa reticularis
 †Atrypella
 †Atrypella borealis
 †Atrypella scheii
 †Atrypella tenuis
 †Atrypoidea
 †Atrypoidea scheii
 †Attenuatella
 †Aulocystis
  †Aulopora
 †Australonema
 †Australophyllum
  †Aviculopecten
 †Aviculopecten chesterensis – tentative report
 †Aviculopecten delawarensis – or unidentified related form
 †Aviculopecten edwardsi – or unidentified related form
 †Aviculopecten fasciculatus – or unidentified related form
 †Aviculopecten hardinensis – or unidentified related form
 †Aviculopecten mccoyi – or unidentified related form
 †Aviculopecten montpelierensis – or unidentified related form
 †Aviculopecten occidentalis – or unidentified related form
 †Aviculopecten similis – or unidentified related form
 † Avonia – tentative report

B

 †Bailiaspis
 †Bailiaspis picta
 Bairdia
 †Balbinipleura
 †Balbinipleura krawczynskii – type locality for species
 †Barocospira
 †Barocospira cindiprellerae – type locality for species
 †Bathyuriscidella
 †Bathyuriscidella socialis
 †Bathyuriscus
 †Bathyuriscus punctatus – type locality for species
 †Batostomella
 †Belemnites – tentative report
  †Bellerophon
 †Bellerophon chapmani
 †Bellerophon livengoodensis
 †Bellerophon spergensis – or unidentified related form
 †Belodina
 †Belowea
 †Belowea variabilis
 †Bembexia – tentative report
 †Bembexia inumbilicata – type locality for species
 †Bensbergia
 †Bensbergia subcostata – or unidentified related form
 †Beraunia
 †Beraunia bifrons
 †Beraunia bohemica
 †Betaneospirifer
 †Betaneospirifer marcoui – or unidentified related form
 †Beyrichia
 †Beyrichia churkini
 †Bicarinatina
 †Bicarinatina kongakutensis – type locality for species
 †Bighornia
 †Bimuria
 †Bimuria gilbertella
 †Blasispirifer
 †Blasispirifer blasii – or unidentified related form
 †Bohemicardia
 †Bohemicardia bohemica – or unidentified comparable form
 †Bolaspidella
 †Bolaspidella wellsvillensis
 †Bothrodendron
 †Bothrodendron kiltorkense
 †Boucotspira
 †Boucotspira carinifer
 †Brachylasma – tentative report
 †Brachymetopus
 †Brachymetopus pseudometopina
 †Brachyprion
 †Brachythyrina
 †Brachythyrina rectangula – or unidentified related form
 †Brachythyris
 †Brachythyris subcardiformis – or unidentified related form
 †Brachythyris subcardiiformis – or unidentified related form
 †Brachythyris suborbicularis – or unidentified related form
 †Brachythyris ufensis – or unidentified related form
 †Breviphyllum
 †Breviphyllum lindstromi – or unidentified comparable form
 †Briscoia – tentative report
 †Bronteus
 †Brooksina
 †Brooksina alaskensis
 †Bruntonia
 †Bruntonia granulifera
 †Bucanopsis
 †Bucanopsis volgulica – or unidentified related form
 †Buechelia
 †Buechelia nodosa
 †Bulimorpha
 †Bulimorphia
 †Bulimorphia peracuta – or unidentified related form
 †Buthrotrephis – tentative report

C

 †Calapoecia
 †Calceola
 †Calceola sandalina – or unidentified comparable form
 †Callaiapsida
 †Callaiapsida arctica
 †Callaiapsida kekuensis – type locality for species
 †Callaiapsida pentameroides – or unidentified related form
 †Calliprotonia – tentative report
 †Callistadia
 †Callograptus
 †Callositella – type locality for genus
 †Callositella cheeneetnukensis – type locality for species
 †Callospiriferina
 †Callospiriferina pinguis
  †Calymene
  †Calymene blumenbachii
 †Calymene iladon
 †Camarotoechia
 †Camarotoechia billingsi – or unidentified comparable form
 †Camarotoechia duplicata – tentative report
 †Camarotoechia winiskensis – or unidentified comparable form
 †Campophyllum – tentative report
 †Cancrinella
 †Cancrinella cancrini – or unidentified related form
 †Cancrinella cancriniformis – or unidentified related form
 †Cancrinella koninckiana – or unidentified related form
 †Cancrinella tenuissima
 †Caneyella – tentative report
 †Capellinia
   Capulus
 †Cardiomorpha – tentative report
 †Carinatina
 †Caruthia – type locality for genus
 †Caruthia borealis – type locality for species
 †Caryocaris
 †Catazyga
  †Catenipora
 †Catenipora jacovikii – or unidentified comparable form
 †Catenipora robustus – or unidentified comparable form
 †Catenipora rubra – or unidentified comparable form
  †Cedaria
 †Centronella
 †Centronella navicella – or unidentified comparable form
 †Ceratiacaris
 †Ceratopea
 †Ceratopea medfraensis – type locality for species
 †Cernuolimbus
 †Cernuolimbus longifrons
 †Chaetetes
 †Chaetetes milleporaceous
 †Chaetetipora
 †Chaetetipora ellesmerensis – or unidentified comparable form
 †Chaoiella
 †Chaoiella gruenewaldti – or unidentified related form
 †Chapinella – type locality for genus
 †Chapinella bucareliensis – type locality for species
 †Charactophyllum
 †Cheeneetnukia – type locality for genus
 †Cheeneetnukia frydai – type locality for species
 †Cheilocephalus
 †Cheilocephalus expansus – type locality for species
 †Cheiropyge
 †Cheiropyge himalayensis
  †Cheirurus
 †Chirognathus – tentative report
 †Chlupacispira – type locality for genus
 †Chlupacispira spinosa – type locality for species
 †Chonetes
 †Chonetes capax – or unidentified related form
 †Chonetes illinoisensis – or unidentified related form
 †Chonetes manitobensis – or unidentified comparable form
 †Chonetes timanicus – or unidentified related form
 †Chonetes verneuile – or unidentified comparable form
 †Chonetes verneuilianus – or unidentified related form
 †Chonetina – report made of unidentified related form or using admittedly obsolete nomenclature
 †Chonetinella
 †Chonetipustula
 †Chonetipustula concentrica
 †Chonetoidea – or unidentified related form
 †Chonophyllum
 †Choristites
 †Christiania
 †Christiania aseptata – type locality for species
 †Chusenella
 †Chusenella atlinensis – or unidentified loosely related form
  †Cladochonus
 †Cladopora
 †Cladospongia – type locality for genus
 †Cladospongia alaskensis – type locality for species
 †Clathronema
 †Clathronema cingulata
 †Clathronema cloughi
  †Cleiothyridina
 †Cleiothyridina milleri – type locality for species
 †Cleiothyridina sublamellosa – or unidentified related form
 †Cleiothyris
 †Cleiothyris suborbiculoides – or unidentified related form
 †Cliefdenella
 †Cliefdenella alaskaensis
  †Climacograptus
 †Climacograptus antiquus – or unidentified related form
 †Climacograptus bicornis
 †Climacograptus eximius – or unidentified comparable form
 †Climacograptus hughesi – or unidentified comparable form
 †Climacograptus indivisus
 †Climacograptus innotatus
 †Climacograptus medius
 †Climacograptus minutus – tentative report
 †Climacograptus phyllophorus – or unidentified comparable form
 †Climacograptus pungens
 †Climacograptus rectangularis
 †Climacograptus scalaris
 †Climacograptus stenotelus
 †Climacograptus trifilis
 †Cliothyridina
 †Cliothyridina incrassata – or unidentified related form
 †Cliothyridina orbicularis – or unidentified related form
 †Cliothyridina sublamellosa – or unidentified related form
 †Clisiophyllum
 †Clorinda
 †Codonofusiella
 †Coelocaulus
 †Coelocaulus karlae – type locality for species
 †Coeloconus
 †Coelospira
 †Coelotrochium
 †Coenites
 †Colpomya – tentative report
 †Colpomya audae – or unidentified related form
 †Colpomya hugini – or unidentified related form
 †Compacoleus
  †Composita
 †Composita ambigua – or unidentified comparable form
 †Composita bellula – or unidentified related form
 †Comuquia
 †Comuquia curvirostris – or unidentified related form
 †Conchidium
 †Conchidium alaskense
 †Conchidium knighti
 †Condrathyris
 †Condrathyris perplexa
 †Conocardium
 †Contortophyllum
 †Cordylodus – tentative report
 †Corymbospongia
 †Corymbospongia adnata
 †Corymbospongia amplia – type locality for species
 †Corymbospongia betella
 †Corynexochus
 †Corynexochus perforatus
 †Corynexochus plumula
 †Corynoides
 †Corynoides tricornis
 †Cotalagnostus – or unidentified comparable form
 †Cotalagnostus lens
 †Cranaena
 †Cranaena romingeri – or unidentified comparable form
  †Crania
 †Craspedalosia – tentative report
 †Craspedelia
 †Craspedelia potterella – type locality for species
 †Crassialveolites
 †Craterophyllum – or unidentified comparable form
 †Craticula – report made of unidentified related form or using admittedly obsolete nomenclature
 †Craticula gotlandica
 †Crurithyris
 †Crurithyris alaskensis – type locality for species
 †Cryptacanthia
 †Cryptacanthia compacta – or unidentified related form
 †Cryptograptus
 †Cryptograptus centrifugus – or unidentified comparable form
 †Cryptograptus schaferi
 †Cryptograptus tricornis
 †Cyathactis
 †Cyathaxonia
 †Cyathodictya
 †Cyathophylloides
 †Cyathophyllum
 †Cyclonema
 †Cyclonema servus
  †Cyclopteris – tentative report
 †Cyclospira
 †Cyclospira elegantula
 †Cyclospira orbus
 †Cymbidium
 †Cymbidium acutum
 †Cymbidium retrorsum
 †Cymostrophia
 †Cymostrophia costatula – or unidentified comparable form
   †Cyphaspis
 †Cypricardella
 †Cypricardina
 †Cypricardina consimilis – or unidentified related form
 †Cypricardinia
 †Cypricardinia contexta
 †Cyrolexis
 †Cyrolexis superstes – or unidentified related form
 †Cyrtia
 †Cyrtina
 †Cyrtina billingsi – or unidentified comparable form
 †Cyrtinaella
 †Cyrtinaella undulata
  †Cyrtoceras
 †Cyrtospira
  †Cyrtospirifer
 †Cyrtospirifer buddingtoni – type locality for species
 †Cyrtospirifer paridaensis
 †Cystihalysites
 †Cystiphylloides
 †Cystiphyllum
 †Cystodictya
 †Cystodictya lineata – or unidentified related form
 †Cystodictya pustulosa – or unidentified related form
 †Cystostroma
 †Cystothalamiella
 †Cystothalamiella alaskaensis
 †Cystothalamiella ducta
 †Cystothalamiella irregularis – type locality for species
 †Cystothalamiella polyducta
 Cytherella – tentative report
 †Cyztograptus

D

 †Daidia
 †Daidia cerithioides
 †Daidia sewardensis
 †Dalmanella
 †Dalmanella occlusa
   †Dalmanites
 †Dasometopus
 †Dasometopus breviceps
 †Dechenella
 †Decorospira
 †Decorospira lepaini – type locality for species
 †Decorospira minutula – type locality for species
 †Decorospira tasselli
 †Deiracorallium
 †Delthyris
 †Delthyris sulcatus
 †Deltopecten
 †Deltopecten caneyanus – or unidentified related form
 †Deltopecten wyandotte – or unidentified related form
 †Dendrograptus
 †Dendrostella
 †Dendrostella rhenana – or unidentified comparable form
  †Dentalium
 †Dentalium hecetaensis
 †Derbyia
 †Derbyia bennetti – or unidentified related form
 †Derbyia grandis – or unidentified comparable form
 †Derbyia robusta – or unidentified related form
 †Diambonia
 †Diambonia discuneata
 †Diaphragmus
 †Dicellograptus
 †Dicellograptus caduceus – or unidentified comparable form
 †Dicellograptus elegans – or unidentified comparable form
 †Dicellograptus gurleyi
 †Dicellograptus sextans
 †Dicellograptus smithi – or unidentified comparable form
 †Dicoelosia
 †Dicoelosia jonesridgensis
 †Dicranograptus
 †Dicranograptus contortus – tentative report
 †Dicricoconus
 †Dicricoconus dutroi
 †Dicricoconus mesodevonicus
 †Dicricoconus triannulatus
 †Dictyoclostus
 †Dictyoclostus gallatinensis – or unidentified related form
 †Dictyoclostus semireticulatus
 †Dictyoclostus tartaricus
 †Dictyonema
  †Didymograptus
 †Didymograptus extensus – or unidentified comparable form
 †Didymograptus nitidus – or unidentified comparable form
 †Didymograptus sagitticaulis
 †Didymograptus serratulus
 †Dielasma
 †Dielasma arkansanum – or unidentified related form
 †Dielasma bovidens – or unidentified related form
 †Dielasma formosum – or unidentified related form
 †Dielasma supracarbonicum – or unidentified related form
 †Digonophyllum
 †Dimorphograptus
 †Dimorphograptus confertus
 †Dimorphograptus physophora
 †Diorthelasma
 †Diorthelasma parvum
 †Diparelasma
 †Diphyphyllum
 †Diplochone
  †Diplograptus
 †Diplograptus cyperoides – or unidentified comparable form
 †Diplograptus elongatus
 †Diplograptus euglyptus
 †Diplograptus hughesi
 †Diplograptus inutilis
 †Diplograptus modestus
 †Diplograptus mucroterminatus
 †Diplograptus multidens – or unidentified related form
 †Diplograptus nicolsoni – or unidentified comparable form
  †Diplopora – tentative report
 †Disphyllum
 †Disphyllum catenatum – or unidentified comparable form
 †Disphyllum goldfussi – or unidentified comparable form
 †Disphyllym – tentative report
 †Diversograptus
 †Doleroides
 †Doleroides panna – or unidentified related form
 †Donaldiella
 †Donaldospira
 †Donaldospira pertusa
 †Dorypyge
 †Dorypyge olenekensis – or unidentified comparable form
 †Drepanodus
 †Drepanoistodus
 †Drepanoistodus suberectus
  †Drepanophycus
 †Droharhynchia
 †Droharhynchia rzhonsnitskayae – type locality for species
 †Dubovikovia
 †Dubovikovia kuzmini – or unidentified comparable form
 †Dunbarula
 †Dunderbergia
 †Dunderbergia seducta – type locality for species
 †Duolobella – type locality for genus
 †Duolobella sandiae – type locality for species
 †Dutrochus – type locality for genus
 †Dutrochus alaskensis – type locality for species
 †Dyoros
 †Dyoros spitzbergianus – or unidentified comparable form
 †Dytremacephalus – tentative report

E

 †Echinoconchus
 †Echinoconchus punctatus
 †Echyropora – tentative report
 †Ectomaria
 †Ectomaria orientalis
 †Ectomaria pagoda – or unidentified comparable form
 †Ectomaria prisca – or unidentified comparable form
 †Edmondia
 †Ekvasophyllum
 †Elburgia
 †Elburgia disgranosa – type locality for species
 †Eleutherokomma
 †Eleutherospira
 †Eleutherospira medfraensis
 † Ella – tentative report
 †Ella simensis – or unidentified related form
 †Ellesmeroceras
   †Elrathia
 †Elrathia alaskensis – type locality for species
 †Emanuella
 †Emanuella altus
 †Emanuella neumani
 †Emmonsia
 †Endothyra
 †Endothyra bowmani – or unidentified related form
 †Entactinia
 †Entactinia modesta
 †Enteletes – tentative report
 †Entelophyllum – tentative report
 †Entomis
 †Entomis pelagica
 †Eoasianites
 †Eoconchidium
 †Eognathodus
 †Eognathodus sulcatus
 †Eomarginifera
 †Eomarginifera longispinus
 †Eomoelleritia – tentative report
 †Eopteria
 †Eopteria richardsoni
 †Eoreticularia – tentative report
 †Eoschuchertella
 †Eospirifer
 †Epiphyton
 †Epitomyonia
 †Epitomyonia relicina
 †Euchondria – tentative report
 †Euchondria neglecta – or unidentified related form
 †Euconospira
 †Euconospira conula – or unidentified related form
 †Eumetria
 †Eumetria verneuiliana
 †Eunema
 †Eunema quadrisulcata – or unidentified comparable form
 †Euomphalopteris – tentative report
 †Euomphalopterus – type locality for genus
 †Euomphalopterus liratus – type locality for species
  †Euomphalus
 †Euomphalus brooksensis
 †Euomphalus bundtzeni
 †Euomphalus planodorsatus – or unidentified related form
 †Euomphalus planorbis
 †Euomphalus utahensis – or unidentified related form
 †Euphemites
 †Euphemites carbonarius
 †Euryzone

F

 †Faberophyllum
 †Falodus
 †Farewellia – type locality for genus
 †Farewellia heidelbergerae – type locality for species
 †Fasciculatia
 †Fasciculatia striatoparadoxa
 †Fasciphyllum – tentative report
   †Favosites
 †Favosites emmonsi – or unidentified comparable form
 †Favosites hemispericus
 †Favosites hemisphericus
 †Favosites limitaris
 †Favosites radiciformis
 †Fenestella
 †Filigreenia
 †Filigreenia circularis
 †Finkelnburgia
 †Fistulella
 †Fistulella undosa
 †Fistulipora
 †Fletcheria – tentative report
 †Fluctuaria
 †Fluctuaria undata – or unidentified related form
 †Follicucullus
 †Follicucullus monacanthus – or unidentified related form
 †Foordites
 †Foordites platypleura – or unidentified comparable form
 †Fusispira
  †Fusulina
 †Fusulina elongata – or unidentified related form
 †Fusulinella
 †Fusulinella eopulchra – or unidentified comparable form

G

 †Gasterocoma – tentative report
 †Gasterocoma bicauli
 †Gastrioceras
 †Gastrioceras nolinense – or unidentified related form
 †Gelidorthis
 †Gelidorthis perisiberiaensis
  †Geragnostus
  †Gervillia
 †Gervillia longa – or unidentified related form
 †Girtyella
 †Girtyocoelia – type locality for genus
 †Girtyocoelia epiporata
 †Girtyocoelia minima
 †Girvanella
 †Girvanella problematica
 †Glaberagnostus
 †Glaberagnostus cicer
 †Glabrocingulum
 †Glabrocingulum grayvillense – or unidentified related form
 †Globoendothyra
 †Glossograptus
 †Glossograptus dentatus – or unidentified comparable form
 †Glossograptus echinatus – or unidentified comparable form
 †Glossograptus hincksii
 †Glossograptus horridus
 †Glossograptus hystrix – or unidentified related form
 †Glyptograptus
 †Glyptograptus enodis – or unidentified comparable form
 †Glyptograptus gnomus
 †Glyptograptus incertus
 †Glyptograptus laciniosus
 †Glyptograptus lanpherei
 †Glyptograptus tamariscus
 †Glyptopora
  †Gomphoceras
  †Goniatites
 †Goniocladia – tentative report
 †Goniophora
 †Goniophora thula – type locality for species
 †Grammysia
 †Granularaspis
 †Graptospongia
  †Grewingkia
 †Grypophyllum
 †Gypidula
 †Gypidula cornuta
 †Gypidula intervenicus – or unidentified comparable form
 †Gypidula optatus
 †Gypidula orbitatus
 †Gypidula pelagica
 †Gypidula perryi
 †Gypidula upatensis
 †Gypiduloides
 †Gypiduloides craigenensis
  †Gypospirifer
 †Gypospirifer condor
 †Gyronema

H

 †Hallograptus
 †Hallograptus mucronatus
   †Halysites
 †Haplistion – tentative report
 †Haplospira
 †Haplospira craigi – type locality for species
 †Hardyoides
 †Hardyoides aspinosa – type locality for species
 †Harperoides – type locality for genus
 †Harperoides alaskensis – type locality for species
  †Harpides
 †Harpidium
 †Harpidium insignis
 †Harpidium latus
 †Harpidium rotundus
 †Hartshillia
 †Hartshillia clivosa
 †Hecetaphyton
 †Hecetaphyton alaskense
 †Hecetastoma – type locality for genus
 †Hecetastoma gehrelsi – type locality for species
 †Hedstroemia – tentative report
 †Hedstromophyllum
 †Helicotoma
 †Helicotoma blodgetti – type locality for species
 †Helicotoma robinsoni – type locality for species
 †Heliolites
  †Heliophyllum
 †Helioplasmolites
  †Hemirhodon
 †Hemitrypa
 †Hercynella
 †Hercynella bohemica
 †Hercynella nobilis
  †Hexagonaria
 †Hindeodus
  †Holopea
 †Holopella
 †Homagnostus
 †Homagnostus alaskensis – type locality for species
 †Hormospongia – type locality for genus
 †Hormospongia acara – type locality for species
 †Hormospongia diarteria – type locality for species
 †Hormospongia labyrinthica – type locality for species
 †Hormotoma
 †Horridonia
 †Horridonia horrida
 †Hostimella
 †Howellella
 †Howellella amsdeni
 †Howellella nucula
 †Howellella yacutica
 †Howellites
 †Howellites amsdeni – type locality for species
 †Howittia
 †Howittia haideri
 †Hustedia
 †Hustedia meekana – or unidentified related form
 †Hustedia remota – or unidentified related form
 †Hustedograptus
 †Hustedograptus teretiusculus
 †Hypagnostus
 †Hypomphalocirrus
 †Hypomphalocirrus rugosus – or unidentified comparable form
 †Hypothyridina
 †Hypothyridina magister

I

 †Icriodus
 †Icriodus angustoides
 †Icriodus taimyricus
 †Iddingsia
 †Iddingsia relativa – type locality for species
 †Idiognathodus
 †Idiostroma
 †Imperatoria
 †Imperatoria media
 †Iowaphyllum
 †Iowaphyllum johanni – or unidentified comparable form
 †Iowatrypa
 †Iowatrypa owenensis
 †Iskutella
 †Iskutella gunningi
 †Isochilina
 †Isograptus
 †Isograptus forcipiformis
 †Isograptus manubriatus – or unidentified comparable form
 †Isorthis
 †Ivdelinia

J

 †Janius
 †Janius velatus – or unidentified comparable form
 †Jedria
 †Jedria deckeri
 †Johnsonathyris – type locality for genus
 †Johnsonathyris adrianensis – type locality for species
 †Juraspis
 †Juraspis schabanovi
 †Juresania
 †Juresania juresanensis – or unidentified related form

K

 †Kahlerina
 †Karavankina
 †Karavankina fasciata – or unidentified related form
 †Ketophyllum
 †Kindleina – type locality for genus
 †Kindleina suemezensis – type locality for species
  †Kionoceras
 †Kirkidium
 †Kirkirhynchus
 †Kirkirhynchus reesidei
 †Kirkospira – type locality for genus
 †Kirkospira glacialis – type locality for species
 †Kirkospira tongassensis – type locality for species
 †Kitikamispira
 †Kitikamispira ormistoni
 †Klakesia
 †Kochiproductus
 †Kochiproductus porrectus – or unidentified related form
 †Komiella
 †Komiella gilberti – type locality for species
 †Komiella ostiolata – or unidentified related form
   †Kootenia
 †Kootenia anabarensis – or unidentified comparable form
 †Kootenia granulospinosa – type locality for species
 †Kootenia serrata – or unidentified comparable form
 †Krausella
 †Krotovia
 †Krotovia pustulata – or unidentified related form
 †Kuskokwimia – type locality for genus
 †Kuskokwimia moorei – type locality for species
 †Kuvelousia
 †Kuvelousia sphiva
 †Kuvelousia weyprechti – or unidentified comparable form

L

 †Labechia
 †Labyrinthites
 †Lacunoporaspis
 Laevidentalium
 †Laevidentalium venustum – or unidentified related form
 †Laioporella
 †Laioporella pyramidata – or unidentified related form
 †Lamprophyllum
 †Latentifistula
 †Laticrura
 †Laticrura pionodema
 †Lecanospira – tentative report
 †Leioclema
 †Leiorhynchus
 †Leiorhynchus greenianum – or unidentified related form
 †Lejopyge
 †Lejopyge calva
  †Lejopyge laevigata
 †Leperditia
 †Lepidocoleus
 †Lepidocoleus britannicus
 †Leptaena
 †Leptaena alaskensis – type locality for species
 †Leptathyris
 †Leptathyris borki
 †Leptellina
 †Leptellina occidentalis
 †Leptelloidea
 †Leptelloidea leptelloides
 †Leptodesma
 †Leptograptus
 †Leptostrophia
 †Libumella – tentative report
 †Licharewia
 †Lichas
 †Ligiscus
 †Ligiscus smithi – type locality for species
 Lima
 †Linguagnostus
 †Linguagnostus gronwalli
  †Lingula
 †Lingula freboldi
 Linguopugnoides
 †Linguopugnoides carens
 †Linograptus
 †Linograptus posthumus – or unidentified related form
 †Linoproductus
 †Linoproductus cora
 †Linoproductus lineatus – or unidentified related form
 †Linoproductus tenuistriatus – or unidentified related form
 †Liosotella
 †Liosotella proboscidea – or unidentified comparable form
 †Liospira
 †Liospira micula
 †Liospira progne – or unidentified comparable form
 †Lissatrypa – tentative report
 †Lissochonetes
 †Lissochonetes geinitzianus – or unidentified related form
 †Lissochonetes morahensis – or unidentified related form
 †Lissochonetes superba – or unidentified comparable form
 †Lithostrotion
 †Lithostrotion mclareni
 †Lithostrotion portlocki – or unidentified related form
 †Lithostrotion sinuosum
 †Lithostrotion warreni
 †Lithostrotionella
 †Lithostrotionella banffensis
 †Lithostrotionella birdi
 †Loganograptus
 †Lonsdaleia
 †Lophophyllum
 †Lophospira
 †Lophospira perangulata – or unidentified comparable form
 †Lophospira serrulata – or unidentified related form
 †Loxonema
 †Loyolophyllum
  †Lucina
 †Lucina proavia – or unidentified comparable form
 †Ludlovia
 †Ludlovia multispora
 †Lunucammina
 †Lunulazona
 †Lunulazona sablei – type locality for species
 †Lykocustiphyllim – tentative report
 †Lyrielasma
 †Lytospira
 †Lytospira subrotunda
 †Lytvophyllum – tentative report
 †Lytvophyllum hongi

M

 †Macgeea
 †Maclurina
 †Maclurina manitobensis – or unidentified comparable form
 †Maclurites
 †Maclurites magnus – or unidentified related form
 †Marginifera
 †Marginifera involuta
 †Marginifera juresanensis – or unidentified comparable form
 †Marginifera lebedevi – or unidentified related form
 †Marginifera splendens – or unidentified related form
 †Marginifera typica – or unidentified related form
 †Marinurnula
 †Marinurnula timanicum – or unidentified comparable form
 †Marjumia
 †Marjumia callas
 †Martinia
 †Martinia maia – or unidentified comparable form
 †Martiniopsis
 †Mastigospira
 †Mastigospira weberae
 †Medfracaulus – type locality for genus
 †Medfracaulus cooki – type locality for species
 †Medfracaulus turriformis
 †Medfraspongia
 †Medfraspongia tubulara
 †Medfrazyga – type locality for genus
 †Medfrazyga clauticae – type locality for species
 †Medfrazyga gilmulli – type locality for species
 †Medlicottia
 †Medlicottia orbigiana – or unidentified related form
 †Meekella – tentative report
 †Meekospira
 †Megagnostus
 †Megagnostus laevis
 †Megagnostus resecta
 †Megalomus
 †Megousia
 †Megousia aagardi
 †Mehlina
 †Menophyllum – tentative report
 †Mephiarges – tentative report
  †Meristella
 †Meristella barrisi – or unidentified comparable form
 †Meristella ceras – or unidentified comparable form
 †Meristella tumida – tentative report
 †Meristina
 †Mesodouvillina
 †Mesofavosites
 Mesophyllum
 †Mesophyllum dachsbergi
 †Metadoliolina – tentative report
 †Michelinia
 †Michelinoceras – tentative report
 †Micidus
 †Micidus stellae
 †Microplasma
 †Miculiella – or unidentified comparable form
 †Mizzia – tentative report
 †Modiolopsis
 †Modiolopsis modiolaris – or unidentified related form
   †Modiolus – tentative report
 †Modiomorpha
 †Modocia
 †Modocia compressa – type locality for species
 †Modocia transversa – type locality for species
 †Moelleritia
 †Moelleritia canadensis
 †Monadotoechia – tentative report
  †Monograptus
 †Monograptus acinaces
 †Monograptus atavus
 †Monograptus bohemicus
 †Monograptus buddingtoni
 †Monograptus calamistratus
 †Monograptus clingani – or unidentified related form
 †Monograptus convolutus
 †Monograptus crenularis – or unidentified comparable form
 †Monograptus crinitus
 †Monograptus cyphus
 †Monograptus difformis – or unidentified comparable form
 †Monograptus dubius
 †Monograptus gregarius
 †Monograptus incommodus – or unidentified comparable form
 †Monograptus involutus – or unidentified comparable form
 †Monograptus nilssoni
 †Monograptus noyesensis
 †Monograptus pacificus
 †Monograptus praedubius – or unidentified related form
 †Monograptus priodon
 †Monograptus pseudodubius
 †Monograptus raitzhainesis – or unidentified related form
 †Monograptus revolutus
 †Monograptus scanicus
 †Monograptus tenuis
 †Monograptus thomasi – or unidentified related form
 †Monograptus tumescens
 †Monograptus uncinatus
 †Monograptus undulatus
 †Monograptus varians
 †Monograptus vulgaris – or unidentified comparable form
 †Monograptus yukonensis
 †Monolaminospongia – type locality for genus
 †Monolaminospongia gigantia – type locality for species
 †Monorakos
 †Monorakos kledos – type locality for species
 †Morania
 †Morania nixonforkensis – type locality for species
 †Morania wagneri – type locality for species
    †Mucrospirifer
 †Mucrospirifer refugiensis – type locality for species
 †Multiconus
 †Multisolenia
 †Murchisonia
 †Myalina
 †Myriospirifer
 †Myriospirifer myriofila – type locality for species
 †Mytilarca
 †Mytilarca boucoti – type locality for species

N

 †Nankinella
 †Nanochilina
 †Nanochilina gubanovi – type locality for species
 †Nanukidium
 †Nanukidium cunninghamensis – or unidentified comparable form
 †Naticella
  †Naticopsis
 †Naticopsis bowsheri
 †Naticopsis carleyana – or unidentified related form
 †Naticopsis suturicompta
 †Nazarovella
 †Nemagraptus
 †Nemagraptus gracilis
 †Nematosalpinx
 †Nematosalpinx dichotomica
 †Nematosalpinx hormathodes – type locality for species
 †Neochonetes
 †Neochonetes granulifer – or unidentified related form
 †Neogondolella
 †Neogondolella idahoensis
  †Neospirifer
 †Neospirifer cameratus
 †Neospirifer fasciger – or unidentified related form
 †Neospirifer striatus – tentative report
 †Nezamyslia
 †Nezamyslia jucunda – or unidentified related form
 †Nicollidina
 †Nicollidina brevis
 †Nicollidina remscheidensis – or unidentified comparable form
 †Nileus
 †Nileus armadillo
 †Niobella
 †Niobella kanauguki – type locality for species
 †Nipponophyllum
 †Nipponophyllum aseptatum – or unidentified comparable form
 †Nodospira – type locality for genus
 †Nodospira ornata – type locality for species
 †Nordospira
 †Nordospira vostokovae – type locality for species
 †Nordotoechia – tentative report
 †Nowakia
 †Nowakia acuaria
 †Nowakia barrandei
 †Nowakia parabarrandei – type locality for species
 †Nucleospira
 †Nucleospira hecetensis
   Nucula
 †Nucula shumardiana – or unidentified related form
 Nuculana – tentative report
 †Nuculites

O

 †Oanduporella
 †Oanduporella kuskokwimensis
 †Odontomaria
 †Odontomaria cheeneetnukensis – type locality for species
 †Odontospirifer
 †Oistodus
 †Oistodus parallelus
 †Oistodus venustus – or unidentified comparable form
 †Olenaspella
 †Olenaspella evansi
 †Oncagnostus
 †Oncagnostus tumidosus
 †Onchonotopsis
 †Onchonotopsis occidentalis – type locality for species
 †Oonoceras
 †Opsiconidion
 †Orbiculoidea
 †Orecopia
 †Orecopia mccoyi – or unidentified comparable form
 †Oriostoma
 †Oriostoma angulatum – or unidentified comparable form
 †Oriostoma princeps
 †Orthis
 †Orthis arcuata – or unidentified comparable form
  †Orthoceras
 †Orthoceras anguliferas – or unidentified comparable form
 †Orthograptus
 †Orthograptus bellulus
 †Orthograptus calcaratus
 †Orthograptus eberleini
 †Orthograptus insectiformis
 †Orthograptus mutabilis – or unidentified comparable form
 †Orthograptus quadrimucronatus
 †Orthograptus truncatus
 †Orthograptus vesiculosus
 †Orthonota
 †Orthonychia
 †Orthophyllum – tentative report
 †Orthotetes
 †Orthotetes chemungensis – or unidentified comparable form
 †Orthotetes crenistria
 †Orthotetes keokuk – or unidentified related form
 †Orthotichia – tentative report
 †Orthotichia morganiana – or unidentified related form
 †Ortonia – tentative report
 †Oulodus
 †Overtonia – tentative report
 †Overtonia fimbriata – or unidentified related form
 †Ozarkodina
 †Ozarkodina confluens
 †Ozarkodina eberleini – type locality for species
 †Ozarkodina paucidentata – or unidentified comparable form

P

 †Pachyfavosites
 †Pachyphloia
 †Pachypora
 †Pachystrophia
 †Pachystrophia devexa – or unidentified comparable form
 †Pachystrophia gotlandicus
 †Paeckelmanella
 †Paeckelmanella dieneri – or unidentified related form
 †Paffrathopsis
 †Paffrathopsis nana – or unidentified related form
  †Pagetia
 †Palaeolima
 †Palaeolima retifera – or unidentified related form
 †Palaeophyllum – or unidentified comparable form
 †Palaeoscheda
 †Palaeoscheda crassimuralis
 †Palaeowingella – type locality for genus
 †Palaeowingella farewellensis – type locality for species
 †Palaeozygopleura
 †Paleofavosites
 †Paleoxyphostylus
 †Paleoxyphostylus variospina
 †Palliseria
 †Palliseria robusta
 †Panderodus
 †Panderodus gracllis – or unidentified comparable form
 †Pandorinellina
 †Pandorinellina exigna
 †Pandorinellina exigua
 †Pandorinellina expansa
 †Pandorinellina steinhornensis
 †Panenka
 †Paracybantyx
 †Paracybantyx occidentalis – type locality for species
    †Paradoxides
 †Parafusulina – tentative report
 †Paraglossograptus
 †Paraglossograptus tentaculatus – or unidentified comparable form
 †Paraliospira
 †Paraliospira angulata
 †Paraliospira mundula
 †Paraliospira planata – or unidentified related form
 †Parallelodon
 †Paraparchites
 †Paraparchites carbonarius – or unidentified related form
 †Paraphillipsia
 †Paraphillipsia aglypta – type locality for species
 †Parapugnax
 †Parapugnax schmidti
 †Pararachnastraea
 †Pararachnastraea gracilis – or unidentified related form
 †Parasolenopleura
 †Parastriatopora
 †Parawedekindellina
 †Parawedekindellina pechorica – or unidentified comparable form
 †Parehmania
 †Parehmania lata – or unidentified comparable form
 †Parisograptus
 †Parisograptus caduceus
 †Paronaella – tentative report
 †Paronaella triporosa
 †Paupospira
 †Paupospira burginensis – or unidentified comparable form
  †Pecopteris
 †Pecopteris arborescens
 †Pecopteris hemitelioides
 †Pecopteris unita
 †Pedderia – type locality for genus
 †Pedderia fragosa – type locality for species
 †Pelekysgnathus
 †Pelekysgnathus klamathensis
 †Pelypora
 †Peneckiella
 †Penekiella
 †Pentamerella
  †Pentamerus
 †Peridon
 †Peridon aculeatus
 †Perimecocoelia
 †Perimecocoelia semicostata
 †Permophricodothyris
 †Permophricodothyris nodosa – or unidentified comparable form
 †Pernipecten
 †Pernopecten
 †Pernopecten aviculatus – or unidentified related form
 †Pernopecten ohioensis – or unidentified related form
  †Peronopsis
 †Peronopsis gaspensis – or unidentified comparable form
 †Petalograptus
 †Petalograptus minor
 †Petalograptus palmeus
 †Petrozium
 †Phacellophyllum
  †Phalagnostus
 †Phalagnostus bituberculatus
 †Phanerotrema
 †Phaulactis
 †Phaulactis angusta – or unidentified comparable form
 †Phaulactis cyathophylloides – or unidentified comparable form
 †Phillipsastrea
 †Phillipsia
 †Phillipsia bufo – tentative report
 †Phillipsia majus – type locality for species
 †Phillipsia megalopos – type locality for species
 †Pholadostrophia – tentative report
 †Pholidocidaris
 †Phragmodus
 †Phragmorthis
 †Phragmorthis buttsi
 †Phricodothyris
 †Phricodothyris guadalupensis – or unidentified related form
  †Phyllograptus
 †Phyllograptus anna – or unidentified comparable form
 †Phylloporella – tentative report
 †Pinacites
 †Pinacites jugleri
 †Pinegathyris – report made of unidentified related form or using admittedly obsolete nomenclature
 †Pinegathyris royssiana – or unidentified related form
  †Pinna
 †Pinnatopora
 †Plagioglypta
 †Planitrochus
 †Plasmophyllum
   †Platyceras
  †Platycrinites
 †Platycrinites nikondaense – type locality for species
 †Platycrinus
 †Platyschisma – tentative report
  Pleurotomaria
 †Plicogypa
 †Plicogypa kayseri – or unidentified comparable form
  †Polygnathus
 †Polygnathus alexanderensis
 †Polygnathus angusticostatus
 †Polygnathus angustipennatus
 †Polygnathus aspelundi
 †Polygnathus borealis
 †Polygnathus brevis
 †Polygnathus churkini
 †Polygnathus costatus
 †Polygnathus eberleini
 †Polygnathus eiflius
 †Polygnathus inversus
 †Polygnathus kennettensis
 †Polygnathus linguiformis
 †Polygnathus pacificus
 †Polygnathus parawebbi
 †Polygnathus perbonus – or unidentified related form
 †Polygnathus praetrigonicus
 †Polygnathus pseudofoliatus
 †Polygnathus robusticostatus
 †Polygnathus samueli
 †Polygnathus sinuosus
 †Polygnathus trigonicus
 †Polygnathus unicornis
 †Polygnathus xylus
 †Polyplacospongia – type locality for genus
 †Polyplacospongia nodosa – type locality for species
 †Polypora
 †Polythalamia
 †Polythalamia americana
 †Prampyx
 †Prampyx difformis
 †Prioniodina
 †Prioniodina flabellum
 †Prisochiton
 †Proampyx
 †Proampyx acuminatus
 †Prodentalium
 †Productella
 †Productella hallana
 †Productus
 †Productus burlingtonesis – or unidentified related form
 †Productus gallatinenesis – or unidentified related form
 †Productus giganteus
 †Productus gruenwaldti – or unidentified related form
 †Productus hirsutiformis
 †Productus inflatus – or unidentified related form
 †Productus jakovlevi – or unidentified related form
 †Productus longus – or unidentified related form
 †Productus mesialis – or unidentified related form
 †Productus ovatus – tentative report
 †Productus sampsoni – or unidentified related form
 †Productus samsoni – or unidentified related form
 †Productus setiger – or unidentified related form
 †Productus striatus – or unidentified related form
  †Proetus
 †Proetus romanooski
 †Prohedinia
 †Prohedinia brevifrons
 †Protathyris
 †Protathyris pacificana
 †Proteoceras
 †Proteoceras obliquum
 †Proteoceras tubulara
 †Protolonsdaleiastraea
 †Protolonsdaleiastraea cargalensis – or unidentified related form
 †Protowentzelella
 †Protowentzelella cystosa
 †Pseudagnostus
 †Pseudagnostus communis
 †Pseudamplexus
 †Pseudamplexus princeps – or unidentified comparable form
 †Pseudoalbaillella
 †Pseudoalbaillella longicornis – or unidentified related form
  †Pseudoamplexus
 †Pseudoamplexus altaicus
 †Pseudobelodina
 †Pseudobelodina adentata – or unidentified comparable form
 †Pseudobelodina vulgaris – or unidentified related form
 †Pseudobornia
 †Pseudobornia ursina
 †Pseudoclimacograptus
 †Pseudoclimacograptus marathonensis – or unidentified comparable form
 †Pseudoclimacograptus scharenbergi
 †Pseudoclimacograptus undulatus – or unidentified comparable form
 †Pseudocryptaenia – tentative report
 †Pseudocryptaenia majewskwi – type locality for species
 †Pseudodoliolina
 †Pseudodoliolina oliviformis
 †Pseudofusulinella
 †Pseudofusulinella praeantiqua – or unidentified comparable form
 †Pseudoharttina
 †Pseudoharttina kayi – type locality for species
  †Pseudomelania
 †Pseudomicroplasma – report made of unidentified related form or using admittedly obsolete nomenclature
 †Pseudomonotis – tentative report
 †Pseudomphalotrochus
 †Pseudomphalotrochus linsleyi
 †Pseudophillipsia – tentative report
 †Pseudophorus
 †Pseudophorus profundus – or unidentified comparable form
 †Pseudoporefieldia
 †Pseudoporefieldia micella
 †Pseudotryplamsa – tentative report
 †Pseudotryplamsa altaica – or unidentified comparable form
 †Pseudotryplasma
 †Pseudotryplasma altaica – or unidentified comparable form
 †Pseudotryplasma altaicus – or unidentified comparable form
 †Psilocamara
  †Psilophyton
    †Pteria – report made of unidentified related form or using admittedly obsolete nomenclature
 †Pterinea
 †Pterinopecten
 †Pterocephalia
 †Pterocephalia constricta – type locality for species
 †Pterospirifer
 †Pterospirifer alatus
  †Ptychagnostus
 †Ptychagnostus aculeatus
 †Ptychagnostus puncturosus
 †Ptychoglyptus
 †Ptychoglyptus alaensis – type locality for species
 †Ptychoglyptus pauciradiatus
 †Ptychomphalina
 †Ptychophyllum
 †Ptychopleurella
 †Ptychopleurella uniplicata
 †Pugnax
 †Pugnax pugnus
 †Pugnax utah – or unidentified related form
 †Pulchratia – tentative report
 †Purdonella – report made of unidentified related form or using admittedly obsolete nomenclature
 †Purdonella nikitini – or unidentified related form
 †Pustula
 †Pustula alternata – or unidentified related form
 †Pustula biseriata – or unidentified related form
 †Pustula blairi – or unidentified related form
 †Pustula carringtoniana – or unidentified related form
 †Pustula concentrica – or unidentified related form
 †Pustula distorta – or unidentified related form
 †Pustula eximia – or unidentified related form
 †Pustula indianensis – or unidentified related form
 †Pustula irginae – or unidentified related form
 †Pustula magnituberculata – or unidentified related form
 †Pustula millespinosa – or unidentified related form
 †Pustula morbilliana – or unidentified related form
 †Pustula nikitini – or unidentified related form
 †Pustula pilosa – or unidentified related form
 †Pustula plicatilis – or unidentified related form
 †Pustula pseudaculeata – or unidentified related form
 †Pustula punctata
 †Pustula rugata – or unidentified related form
 †Pustula semicostata – or unidentified related form
 †Pustula spinulosa – or unidentified related form
 †Pustula subhorrida – or unidentified related form
 †Pustula tuberculata – or unidentified related form
 †Pustula wallaciana – or unidentified related form
 †Pustula wallacianus – or unidentified related form
 †Pycnactis – tentative report
 †Pycnolithus – tentative report
 †Pylentonema
 †Pylentonema antiqua – or unidentified comparable form

Q

 †Quadricarina
 †Quadricarina noklebergi – type locality for species
 †Quasifusulina
 †Quasifusulina longissima – or unidentified related form
 †Quebecaspis
 †Quebecaspis aspinosa – type locality for species
 †Quebecaspis conifrons – tentative report

R

 †Rachiopteris
 †Raphistoma – tentative report
 †Raphistoma alaskensis – type locality for species
 †Raphistomina
 †Raphistomina rugata – or unidentified comparable form
 †Rastrites
 †Rastrites longispinus – or unidentified comparable form
 †Rastrites peregrinus – or unidentified related form
    †Receptaculites
 †Rectograptus
 †Rectograptus amplexicaulis
 †Remipyga
 †Renalcis
 †Renalcis tuberculatus – or unidentified comparable form
 †Reteograptus
 †Reteograptus geinitzianus
 †Reticularia
 †Reticularia setigera – or unidentified related form
 †Reticulariopsis
 †Reticulariopsis bicollina
 †Retiolites
 †Retiolites geinitzianus
 †Retispira
 †Retispira sullivani
 †Reuschia
 †Rhabdomeson
 †Rhabdostropha
 †Rhabdostropha primitiva
 †Rhaphidophyllum
 †Rhenozyga
 †Rhenozyga reifenstuhli – type locality for species
 †Rhineoderma – tentative report
 †Rhineoderma wortheni – or unidentified related form
 †Rhipidomella
 †Rhipidomella carbonaria – or unidentified related form
 †Rhipidomella nevadensis – or unidentified related form
 †Rhipidomella uralica – or unidentified related form
 †Rhizophyllum
 †Rhizophyllum schischkaticum
 †Rhombopora
  †Rhynchonella
 †Rhynchonella amalthea – or unidentified comparable form
 †Rhynchonella livonica
 †Rhynchopora
 †Rhynchopora beecheri – or unidentified related form
 †Rhynchopora geinitziana – or unidentified related form
 †Rhynchopora kochi – or unidentified comparable form
 †Rhynchopora nikitini – or unidentified related form
 †Rhytiodentalium
 †Rhytiodentalium kentuckyensis – or unidentified comparable form
 †Richardsonella
 †Richthofenia
 †Richthofenia lawrenciana – or unidentified related form
 †Rigbyetia
 †Rigbyetia obconica
 †Roadoceras
 †Roadoceras roadense – or unidentified comparable form
 †Roemeria – or unidentified comparable form
 †Rothpletzella
 †Rothpletzella gotlandica
 †Rousseauspira
 †Rousseauspira teicherti
 †Rugaltarostrum
 †Rugaltarostrum congregabile – type locality for species
 †Rugatia
 †Rugatia occidentalis – or unidentified related form
 †Rugivestis
 †Rugivestis girtyi – type locality for species
 †Rugosatrypa
 †Rugosatrypa flexibilis

S

 †Saffordophyllum
 †Salairophyllum
 †Sanguinolites
 †Sannemannia
 †Sannemannia glenisteri – or unidentified related form
 †Sarcinula
 †Savagerhynchus – type locality for genus
 †Savagerhynchus hecetaensis – type locality for species
 †Scalites
 †Scalites tellerensis – type locality for species
 †Scaphina – tentative report
 †Scaphorthis
 †Scaphorthis virginiensis
 †Scharfenbergia
 †Scharfenbergia concentrica
 †Scharfenbergia impella
 †Scharfenbergia ruestae
 †Scharfenbergia tailleurense
 †Scharyia
 †Schizodus
 †Schizophoria
 †Schizophoria fragilis – or unidentified comparable form
 †Schizophoria macfarlani
 †Schizophoria striatula
 †Schizophoria swallowi – or unidentified related form
 †Schizoproetoides – tentative report
 †Schmidtella
 †Schrenkiella
 †Schrenkiella schrenki – or unidentified comparable form
 †Schuchertella
 †Schwagerina
 †Schwagerina jenkinsi – or unidentified comparable form
 †Sciophyllum
 †Sciophyllum alaskaensis
 †Sciophyllum lambarti
 †Scotoharpes
 †Scotoharpes raaschi – or unidentified related form
 †Semicoccinium – tentative report
 †Semicyclus
 †Semicyclus brabbi
 †Semisphaerocephalus
 †Semisphaerocephalus latus – type locality for species
 †Septabrunsiina
 †Septacamera
 †Septacamera kutorgae
 †Septacamera opitula – tentative report
 †Septacamera pybensis – type locality for species
 †Septacamera stupenda – type locality for species
 †Septaglomospiranella
 †Septimyalina
 †Septimyalina perattenuata – or unidentified related form
 †Septopora – tentative report
 †Serpulospira
 †Shumardella
 †Shumardella missouriensis
 †Sibirirhynchia
 †Sibirirhynchia alata
 †Sibiritia
 †Sibiritoechia – tentative report
 †Sibiritoechia sylvia
 †Sieberella
 †Sigmocheilus – tentative report
 †Sigmocheilus compressus – type locality for species
 †Sinutropis
 †Sinutropis esthetica – type locality for species
 †Sinutropis spiralis – type locality for species
 †Siphonophrentis – tentative report
 †Siskiyouspira
 †Skenidioides
 †Skenidioides multifarius
 †Smithiphyllum
 †Sociophyllum
 †Sociophyllum glomerulatum – or unidentified comparable form
 †Solenopleura
  †Solenopora
 †Solenopora compacta
 †Solenopora filiformis
 †Solenopsis – tentative report
 †Sowerbina
 †Sowerbina timanica – or unidentified comparable form
 †Sowerbyella
 †Sowerbyella praecursor – type locality for species
 †Sowerbyella rectangularis – type locality for species
 †Spathognathodus
 †Spathognathodus inclinatus
 †Spencella
 †Spencella acanthina
 †Spencella montanensis
 †Sphaerina
 †Sphaerina congregata
  †Sphaerocodium
 †Sphaerodoma
 †Sphenosteges
 †Sphenosteges hispidus – or unidentified related form
 †Spinatrypa
 †Spinatrypa spinosa
 †Spinatrypa trulla – or unidentified comparable form
 †Spinicharybdis
 †Spinicharybdis boucoti – type locality for species
 †Spinicharybdis krizi – type locality for species
 †Spinulrichospira – type locality for genus
 †Spinulrichospira cheeneetnukensis – type locality for species
 †Spinulrichospira churkini – type locality for species
  †Spirifer
 †Spirifer allatus – or unidentified related form
 †Spirifer anossofi
 †Spirifer bifurcatus – or unidentified related form
 †Spirifer bisulcatus – or unidentified related form
 †Spirifer cheiropteryx – or unidentified comparable form
 †Spirifer disjunctus
 †Spirifer duplicicostatus
 †Spirifer hians
 †Spirifer incertus – or unidentified related form
 †Spirifer indeferens
 †Spirifer keokuk – or unidentified related form
 †Spirifer missouriensis – or unidentified related form
 †Spirifer mosquensis – or unidentified related form
 †Spirifer pellensis – or unidentified related form
 †Spirifer schellwieni – or unidentified related form
 †Spirifer subcomprimatus
 †Spirifer thetides – or unidentified comparable form
 †Spirifer thetidis
 †Spiriferella
 †Spiriferella arctica
 †Spiriferella artica
 †Spiriferella interplicata – or unidentified related form
 †Spiriferella keilhavii
 †Spiriferella pseudotibetana
 †Spiriferellina
 †Spiriferellina cristata – or unidentified related form
  †Spiriferina
 †Spiriferina holtzapfeli – or unidentified related form
 †Spiriferina panderi – or unidentified related form
 †Spiriferinaella
 †Spiriferinaella artiensis – or unidentified related form
 †Spiriferinaella tastubensis – or unidentified related form
  Spirorbis
 †Spongophyllum
 †Spyroceras
 †Squamularia
 †Stauria
 †Stegocoelia – tentative report
 †Stelliporella
 †Stenoloron
 †Stenoloron swallovana – or unidentified related form
 †Stenopora
 †Stenorhynchia
 †Stenoscisma
 †Stenoscisma bisinuata – or unidentified related form
 †Stenoscisma crumena – or unidentified related form
 †Stenoscisma margaritovi
 †Stenoscisma mutabilis – or unidentified related form
 †Stenoscisma purdoni – or unidentified related form
 †Stenoscisma spitzbergiana
 †Stictopora
 †Stigmosphaerostylus
 †Stigmosphaerostylus itsukaichiensis
 †Stipespongia – type locality for genus
 †Stipespongia laminata – type locality for species
 †Straparollina
 †Straparollina circe
 †Straparollina eurydice – or unidentified comparable form
 †Straparollus
 †Straparollus spergenensis – or unidentified related form
 †Streblopteria
 †Streblopteria montpelierensis – or unidentified related form
 †Streblotrypa – tentative report
 †Streptacis
 †Streptacis subgracilis – or unidentified related form
 †Streptorhynchus
 †Streptorhynchus pelargonatum – or unidentified related form
 †Streptorhynchus pelargonatus – or unidentified related form
 †Streptotrochus
 †Streptotrochus amicus – or unidentified comparable form
 †Striatifera
 †Striatifera ischmensis – or unidentified related form
 †Striatopora
 †Striatostyliolina
  †Stringocephalus
 †Stringocephalus burtini
 †Stringophyllum
 †Strobeus
 †Stromatopora
 †Strophalosia – tentative report
   †Strophomena
 †Strophomena comitans
 †Strophomena fugax – or unidentified comparable form
 †Strophomena planobesa
 †Strophomena stephani
 †Strophonella
 †Strophostylus
 †Styliolina
 †Styliolina fissurella
 †Subanarcestes – tentative report
 †Sumatrina – tentative report
 †Svalbardia
 †Svalbardia toulai
 †Sycidium
  †Syringopora
 †Syringopora formosa – type locality for species
 †Syringopora obesa
 †Syringopora rockfordensis
 †Syringopora schulzei
 †Syringoporella
 †Syringoporella rara – type locality for species
 †Syringoporinus
 †Syringothyris

T

 †Tabularia
 †Tabulophyllum
   †Taeniocrada
 †Taimyrophyllum
 †Taimyrrhynx
 †Taimyrrhynx taimyrico
 †Taphrorthis
 †Taphrorthis immatura
 †Tchaiaspis
 †Tcherskidium
 †Tcherskidium unicum
 †Teganium
 †Teguliferina – tentative report
 †Teichertina
 †Telinopsis
   †Tentaculites
 †Tenticospirifer
 †Tenticospirifer wadleighensis
 †Terrakea – tentative report
 †Tersella
 †Tersella sainsburyi – type locality for species
 †Tetradium
  †Tetragraptus
 †Tetragraptus quadribrachiatus – or unidentified comparable form
 †Tetraprioniodus – tentative report
 †Thamniscus – tentative report
 †Thamnophyllum
 †Thamnopora
 †Thamnosia
 †Thamnosia arctica
 †Thecostegites
 †Theodossia
 †Theodossia albertoensis
 †Tholifrons – type locality for genus
 †Tholifrons adevna – type locality for species
 †Tholifrons minutus – type locality for species
 †Thysanophyllum
 †Thysanophyllum astraeiforme
 †Thysanophyllum orientale
 †Tiramnia
 †Tiramnia greenlandica
 †Tityrophora – tentative report
 †Tollina
 †Tortodus
 †Tortodus kockelianus
 †Tortodus kockeliensis
 †Torynifer
 †Torynifer pseudolineatus – or unidentified related form
 †Tostonia
 †Trabeculites
 †Transridgeia – type locality for genus
 †Transridgeia costata – type locality for species
 †Trapezophyllum
 †Tremanotus
 †Trepospira – tentative report
 †Triaenosphaera
 †Triaenosphaera hebes
   †Triarthrus
 †Trigonirhynchia
 †Trigonirhynchia ventricosa – or unidentified related form
 †Triplophyllum
 †Triticites
 †Trochomphalus
 †Trochomphalus dimidiatus
 †Trochonema
 †Trochonema retrorsum – or unidentified related form
 †Trochonema wartheni
 †Trochonemella
 †Trochonemella churkini – type locality for species
 †Trochonemella reusingi – type locality for species
 †Tropidodiscus
 †Tryplasma
 †Tscherkidium
 †Tuberculatella
 †Tuberculatella tuberculata – or unidentified related form
 †Tubina
 †Turbonellina
 †Turbonellina chatzepovkensis – or unidentified related form
 †Turbospongia – type locality for genus
 †Turbospongia biperforata – type locality for species
 †Turrilepas
 †Turrilepas type locality for species A – informal
 †Tuxekanella
 †Tuxekanella simplex

U

 †Ulungaratoconcha – type locality for genus
 †Ulungaratoconcha heidelbergeri – type locality for species
 †Uncinulus – report made of unidentified related form or using admittedly obsolete nomenclature
 †Uncinulus polaris
 †Undatrypa
 †Uniconus
 †Uniconus livnensis
 †Uniconus orbiculus
 †Uraloceras
 †Uraloceras burtiense
 †Uraloceras fedorowi
 †Uraloceras involutum
 †Uraloceras nevadense

V

 †Verbeekina
 †Verneuilia
 †Verneuilia langenstrasseni – type locality for species
 †Virgulaspongia – type locality for genus
 †Virgulaspongia uniforma – type locality for species
 †Viriatellina – or unidentified comparable form
 †Viriatellina gemuendina

W

 †Waagenites
 †Waagenites trapezoidalis – or unidentified related form
 †Waagenoconcha
 †Waagenoconcha humboldti
 †Waagenoconcha irginae – or unidentified comparable form
 †Waagenoconcha irginaeformis – or unidentified comparable form
 †Waagenoconcha payeri
 †Waagenoconcha tastubensis
 †Warrenella
 †Wedekindellina
 †Wedekindellina uralica
 †Westbroekina
 †Westbroekina chacoensis
 †Westergaardodina
 †Whidbornella
 †Whidbornella lachrymosa – or unidentified comparable form
 †Whitfieldella
 †Wilberrya
 †Winterbergiella
 †Winterbergiella binodosa – or unidentified related form
  †Wodnika
 †Wodnika borealis

X

 †Xenambonites
 †Xenambonites revelatus
 †Xystriphyllum
 †Xystriphyllum devonicum
 †Xystriphyllum gorskii
 †Xystriphyllum schluteri

Y

 †Yabeina
 †Yacutipora
 †Yakovlevia
 †Yakovlevia greenlandica – or unidentified comparable form
 †Yakovlevia mammata
 †Yakovlevia multistriata – or unidentified related form

Z

 †Zacanthoides
 †Zamiopteris
 †Zaphrenthis
 †Zaphrenthis gigantea
 †Zelophyllum
 †Zonophyllum
 †Zygopleura

References

 

Paleozoic
Life
Alaska
Alaska-related lists